Sachin Gupta is a marketing science academic, the Henrietta Louis Johnson Professor of Management and Professor of Marketing in the Samuel Curtis Johnson Graduate School of Management at Cornell University in Ithaca, New York State, and the editor-in-chief of the American Marketing Association's  Journal of Marketing Research, He is known for his work on marketing strategy, international marketing and management communication.

Education 
B.A. (Honours) Economics, St. Stephen's College, Delhi University, India, 1982 
Post Graduate Diploma in Management, Indian Institute of Management, Ahmedabad, India, 1984
Ph.D. in Management, Cornell University, Ithaca, NY, 1993

Academic experience
His academic positions have been as follows: 
2000–2005: Assistant Professor of Marketing, Kellogg School of Management, Northwestern University 
2000–2005: Associate Professor of Marketing
July 2005 to present: Samuel Curtis Johnson Graduate School of Management at Cornell University
2005 to present: Professor of Marketing  Samuel Curtis Johnson Graduate School of Management, 
2007 to present: Henrietta Johnson Louis Professor of Management, Samuel Curtis Johnson Graduate School of Management
2016–2018: Director of the Ph.D. Program in Management, Samuel Curtis Johnson Graduate School of Management

Selected publications
 Kim, Sungjin, Sachin Gupta and Clarence Lee. "Donors and Member-Donors for Effective Nonprofit Fundraising." Journal of Marketing 72, no. 3 (2008): 48-63.
 Kim, Sungjin, Clarence Lee, and Sachin Gupta, “Bayesian Synthetic Control Methods,” Journal of Marketing Research, 57, 5, October, 831-852. 2020 Winner of the 2020 Paul E. Green Award of the American Marketing Association.
 SachinGupta, AravindHaripriya, Ravilla DRavindran, ThulasirajRavilla, "Differences Between Male and Female Residents in Case Volumes and Learning in Cataract Surgery" Journal of Surgical Education
 Yu Yu and Sachin Gupta, “Pioneering Advantage in Generic Drug Competition,” International Journal of Pharmaceutical and Healthcare Marketing, 8, 2, 2014. this article got Outstanding Paper award 2014.

According to Google Scholar,  his works have been cited over 4000 times, giving him an h-index of 26.

Honors 
American Marketing Association-EBSCO Annual Award for Responsible Research in Marketing
Paul E. Green Award by American Marketing Association
William H. O'Dell Award by American Marketing Association for Mining Marketing Meaning from Online Chatter: Strategic Brand Analysis of Big Data Using Latent Dirichlet Allocation
Visiting Scholar Stanford University, Graduate School of Business, Jan – March 2019
 Visiting Professor MYRA School of Business, Mysore, India, March 2015
 Visiting Professor, Indian School of Business, Hyderabad, India December 2004, November 2005
 Visiting Professor, Nanjing University School of Management, Nanjing, China August 2005

References

American business writers
American economics writers
American marketing people
Living people
1948 births
Cornell University alumni
Cornell University faculty
Journal of Marketing Research editors